Pedreguer is a town and municipality in the comarca of Marina Alta in the province of Alicante, Spain. The town is situated at the foot of the Muntanya Gran and close to the two larger coastal towns of Dénia and Xàbia. It has a population of 7097 (as of 2008). It is also close to the Jalon Valley which is famous for its springtime almond tree blossom.

Pedreguer Rastro is a sort of flea market in the town. Sunday morning is flea market day. Held on the polygons where people flock from all over the Costa Blanca to buy and sell produce, clothing, gifts, home made jams, chutneys and much more.

Saturday morning is the farmers market held in the town.

The main high street has a church, police station and the town hall.

A Sports centre is located on the polygons with an outdoor swimming pool and other sports facilities.

La Sella resort comes under Pedreguer town which has a golf course, tennis club and local bars and restaurants including the Brassa Armells.

Fiestas in Pedreguer include bull runs to firework displays.

Local beaches include Denia, El Verger, Els Poblets and Oliva.

Important figures
 Celedonio Calatayud (Pedreguer, October 29, 1880 – Madrid, January 24, 1931) was a Spanish scientist and radiologist, remembered for his achievements on radiology and electrology. He pioneered the use of radiology and electrology in Europe for both diagnostics and therapeutical purposes. In 1928 he was declared favourite son of Pedreguer.

References

View Slide Show Virtual Tour 
 Policia Local de Pedreguer

Marina Alta